This is a list of corps serving within the armies of the British Empire during the Second World War.

A Corps was either a temporary military formation created for combat, or an "administrative" formation that coordinated specialist military functions across a national military force. A combat Corps was composed of specialist units from various "administrative" Corps from combat arms, combat support arms and combat services. Combat Arms were formation sized units from the Corps of infantry and armour, usually 2 or more divisions in strength. Combat Support Arms were smaller units from the Corps of artillery, engineers, signals, intelligence or reconnaissance. Combat Services were units from the Corps of medicine, general services, ordnance, pioneers, logistics and other more specialized functions. For example, I Canadian Corps consisted of 1 infantry division, 1 armour division, 1 armour brigade and Corps Troops (20 plus companies from the Corps of engineers, signals, medicine, military police, etc...)

Military formations within the British Empire were composed of a changing mix of units from across Britain, its colonies and the dominions. As a result, military formations within the Empire and Commonwealth are not easily attributable to specific Imperial or national entities and naming conventions do not necessarily correlate with modern country names.

British Army 
Field Corps

 I Airborne Corps
 1 Anti-Aircraft Corps
 2 Anti-Aircraft Corps
 3 Anti-Aircraft Corps
 I Corps
 II Corps

 III Corps
 IV Corps
 V Corps
 VII Corps
 VIII Corps
 IX Corps

 X Corps
 XI Corps
 XII Corps
 XIII Corps
 XXX Corps

Combat Arms

 Army Air Corps
 Corps of Royal Marines

 Royal Armoured Corps
 Royal Tank Corps

Combat Support Arms

Reconnaissance Corps
Royal Engineers
 Intelligence Corps

 Royal Artillery
 Royal Corps of Signals

Combat Services

Army Catering Corps
Auxiliary Territorial Service
Corps of Military Police
 General Service Corps

Military Provost Staff Corps
 Pioneer Corps
 Royal Army Medical Corps

 Royal Army Ordnance Corps
 Royal Army Pay Corps
 Royal Army Service Corps
 Royal Army Veterinary Corps
 Royal Electrical and Mechanical Engineers

Other

 Army Educational Corps
 Mechanised Transport Corps
 Non-Combatant Corps

 Royal Army Dental Corps
 Royal Army Physical Training Corps 
 Royal Electrical and Mechanical Engineers

Imperial and Dominion

Australian Army
Field Corps

I Australian Corps
II Australian Corps

III Australian Corps
ANZAC Corps

Combat Arms

Royal Australian Armoured Corps
Royal Australian Infantry Corps
Australian Army Aviation Corps

Combat Support Arms

Australian Machine Gun Corps
Royal Australian Artillery
Royal Australian Corps of Signals

Royal Australian Engineers
Australian Intelligence Corps

Combat Services

Australian Instructional Corps
Australian Army Band Corps
Australian Army Catering Corps
Australian Army Veterinary Corps
Australian Staff Corps
Corps of Staff Cadets

Royal Australian Army Chaplains Department
Royal Australian Army Dental Corps
Royal Australian Army Medical Corps
Royal Australian Army Nursing Corps
Royal Australian Army Ordnance Corps
Royal Australian Army Pay Corps

Royal Australian Army Service Corps
Royal Australian Corps of Military Police
Royal Australian Corps of Transport
Royal Australian Electrical and Mechanical Engineers
Royal Australian Survey Corps
Women's Royal Australian Army Corps

Other

Civil Construction Corps

Canadian Army
Field Corps

 Canadian Corps
 I Canadian Corps
 II Canadian Corps

Combat Arms

 Canadian Infantry Corps
 Canadian Armoured Corps

Combat Support Arms

 Canadian Intelligence Corps
 Royal Canadian Artillery

 Corps of Royal Canadian Engineers
 Royal Canadian Corps of Signals

Combat Services

 Canadian Army Chaplain Corps
 Canadian Provost Corps
 Canadian Women's Army Corps
 Central Canada Aircraft Detection Corps(RCAF)
 Corps of Military Staff Clerks

Corps of Royal Canadian Electrical and Mechanical Engineers
 Royal Canadian Army Medical Corps
 Royal Canadian Army Pay Corps
 Royal Canadian Army Service Corps
 Royal Canadian Army Veterinary Corps

 Royal Canadian Dental Corps
 Royal Canadian Ordnance Corps
 Royal Canadian Postal Corps

Other

Canadian Technical Training Corps
Canadian Officers' Training Corps

 Canadian Forestry Corps
Corps of Canadian Fire Fighters (auxiliary to UK)

Army of India
Field Corps

Indian III Corps
IV Corps
Indian XV Corps

Indian XXI Corps
Indian XXXIII Corps

Indian XXXIV Corps
Burma Corps

Combat Arms

 Infantry
Indian Armoured Corps

Combat Support Arms

 Indian Army Air Defence
 Indian Army Aviation Corps
Indian Army Corps of Signals

 Indian Army Corps of Engineers
 Regiment of Indian Artillery

Combat Services

 Burma Hospital Corps
 Corps of Indian Military Police
 Corps of Indian Electrical and Mechanical Engineers
 Indian Army Dental Corps

 Indian Army Hospital Corps
 Indian Army Medical Corps
 Indian Army Ordnance Corps
 Royal Indian Army Service Corps

 Military Farm Corps
 Pioneer Corps
Remount Veterinary Corps
 Women's Auxiliary Corps (India)

New Zealand Military Forces
Field Corps

 New Zealand Corps
 ANZAC Corps

Combat Arms

 New Zealand Armoured Corps
 New Zealand war-raised battalions

Combat Support Arms

 New Zealand Engineers
 New Zealand Intelligence Corps

 Royal Regiment of New Zealand Artillery
 Royal New Zealand Corps of Signals

Combat Services

 New Zealand Military Police
 New Zealand Electrical and Mechanical Engineers
 New Zealand Staff Corps

New Zealand Veterinary Corps
 Royal New Zealand Army Medical Corps
 Royal New Zealand Army Nursing Corps

 Royal New Zealand Army Ordnance Corps
 Royal New Zealand Corps of Transport
 Women's Auxiliary Army Corps (New Zealand)

South African Army
Field Corps

Cape Corps
 South African Coast Defence Corps

Combat Arms

South African Tank Corps
Infantry Branch (Citizen Force)

Combat Support Arms

 South African Corps of Signals
 South African Engineer Corps
South African Intelligence Corps

Combat Services

 Army Postal Service
 Indian and Malay Service Corps
 Native Military Corps
 Q Services Corps
 South African Corps of Mechanics

South African Corps of Military Police
 South African Medical Corps
 South African Ordnance Corps
 South Africa Pay Corps
 South African Service Corps

 South Africa Veterinary Corps
 Technical Services Corps ("T Corps")
Women's Auxiliary Army Service
 Women's Auxiliary Military Police Corps

Colonies and Protectorates
Field Corps (not all standard corps size)

Bikaner Camel Corps
Ceylon Planters' Rifle Corps
East Arab Corps

Hong Kong Volunteer Defence Corps 
 Somaliland Camel Corps

Combat Support Arms

East African Artillery
 Rhodesian Armoured Corps

West African Artillery
West African Engineers

Combat Services 

 African Pioneer Corps
East African Army Service Corps
 East African Military Labour Corps
 Fijian Labour Corps

 Gilbert Islands Labour Corps
Mauritius Civil Labour Corps
 Northern Rhodesian African Labour Corps
 Solomon Islands Labour Corps

 Southern Rhodesian Labour Corps
 West African Military Labour Corps
 West African Army Service Corps
Women's Auxiliary Service (Burma)

See also
 List of British Empire divisions in the Second World War
Military history of the British Commonwealth in the Second World War

References

History of the Second World War (104 volumes), Her Majesty's Stationery Office, London 1949 to 1993
Official History of Australia in the War of 1939–1945 (22 volumes), Australian Government Printing Service, 1952 to 1977
 Official History of the Canadian Army in the Second World War, Vol I Six Years of War, Stacey, C P., Queen's Printer, Ottawa, 1955
 The Canadian Army 1939 – 1945, An Official Historical Summary, Stacey, C P., Queen's Printer, Ottawa, 1948
Official History of the Indian Armed Forces in the Second World War 1939-45 (24 volumes), Combined Inter-Services Historical Section, India & Pakistan, New Delhi, 1956-1966
Official History of New Zealand in the Second World War 1939–45, Historical Publications Branch, Wellington, New Zealand, 1965
 Official Lineages DND, Ottawa

British Empire corps